PREMature is a British television drama miniseries produced by Liger Films that first aired on the Community Channel (now Together). It was crowdfunded through Kickstarter and is the first drama series for the Community Channel, consisting of 6 episodes.

Synopsis
Prem Mehta (Karanvir Bhupal) is a high school teenager who experiences the loss of his grandmother during his summer holidays, closely followed by the separation of his parents. He is forced to take a lonely path during the aftermath of these events as he forms new friendships with the unlikeliest of people.

Throughout his journey, Prem experiences an array of revelations in sometimes surreal circumstances as he builds towards his growth as a young man.

Cast
 Prem Mehta, played by Karanvir Bhupal, is a teenager struggling with his grandmother's death and his parents' separation.
 Will Brown, played by Daniel Costello, is a new student bullied at school and befriended by Prem.
 Neelam Mehta, played by Meera Ganatra, is Prem's mother who's suffering from the loss of her mother and marital problems.
 Parthav Mehta, played by Manish Patel, is Prem's father who's been unfaithful to his wife and feels responsible for the family discord.
 Nina Mehta, played by Samantha Shellie, is Prem's sister who's in a relationship with an older man. 
 Jacob Pearce, played by Tom Carter, is a school teacher coping with personal problems while mentoring Prem through his. 
 Suhina Qadri, played by Simi Dhillon, is an intelligent student and love interest of Prem's.
 Will's Mother, played by Sam Bonner, is Will's disabled mother who's addiction is destroying her relationship with her son. 
 Darren Baisden, played by Leo Eaglewood, is Nina's boyfriend who provides optimism and perspective.
 Sunny Kanda, played by Mirza Hassan, is a school bully who torments Will.
 Theo Clarke, played by Harold Addo, is Sunny's best friend who also instigates Will's negative experiences at school. 
 Baa, played by Surinder Powar, is Prem's deceased grandmother who appears as an apparition.

Production

Development
The series idea was initially conceived in an attempt to bring an unconventional drama series format to a national television audience incorporating experimental techniques familiar in independent and art house films.

A pilot episode was originally shot during 2013 on a budget of £1,000 funded entirely by series creator, Rohith S. Katbamna and co-producer, Terry Mardi. Casting for the pilot involved over 100 performers attending a two-day audition. Performers ranged from professional actors to those who had never acted prior. The process aimed to find performers/people with similar qualities or had personally experienced certain situations as their on-screen characters. It was the director's intention to cast all unknowns.

The title role of Prem Mehta was cast to purposefully go against the mainstream screen look of teenagers. Karanvir Bhupal partly earned the role of Prem Mehta for his distinctive appearance.

After the pilot was completed, it was pitched as a six-part drama series to the Community Channel - a UK broadcaster known primarily for factual content. The series was dubbed as an experimental drama and would contain influences ranging from avant-garde to social realism.

Along with an acquisition fee from the Community Channel, a Kickstarter campaign to raise £35,000 between April - June 2014 took place. The campaign was successful raising £35,333, however this total was reduced to £31,893.77 after administration fees from Kickstarter were collected.

Music
The score is composed by South African musician, John Atterbury. The composition involved a process of fusing audio manipulation and live instrumentation, concurrently with tape loops, recordings in the field and programming to present the most organic and contemporary sound possible. This entire process concluded with a music score consisting of 97 tracks for all six episodes of PREMature, including the final song, "The Start", featuring vocals by London singer/musician, Donna Thompson.

The theme for the UK trailers was composed by London-based musician Roly Witherow, who had heard about the series through Kickstarter and contacted the director.

Broadcast

United Kingdom
The series began airing on the Community Channel from 22 February 2015 at a post-watershed time slot due to mature content. This initial broadcast run was made available online to UK based users on two platforms (TVPlayer and TVCatchup) where viewers are able to stream live television.

Availability
The entire series was made available on YouTube in January 2018.

Themes
With teenage characters at the helm of the story, PREMature delves into issues such as bullying in the form of physical, verbal, psychological and online. Also highlighted are teen anxiety, depression, isolation, identity, drugs and relationships. The one constant is that Prem is forced to confront the divorce of his parents and his grandmother's death simultaneously whilst his friend Will struggles in a single-parent home with his deeply troubled mother.

Throughout the relationship between Nina and Darren, existential discussions are heard questioning existence, social behaviour and the reluctance to accept happiness. Nina talks of cynicism and doubting her place in life whilst Darren attempts to counter these feelings with optimism.

Death is a prominent theme that carries on throughout the series particularly the effect of losing someone close and how certain characters are forced to confront and deal with this new absence from their lives. The way in which a teenager and an adult deal with this theme is examined through their respective paths taken

At times, the story shifts into moments of surreal and often psychedelic sequences that exhibit the inner thoughts and subconscious state of minds of certain characters when found in specific situations of heightened tension or isolation.

Episodes

Reception

Critical response
PREMature has received very positive reviews from critics. Asian Culture Vulture gave the series 4 out of 5 stars, stating that "the show takes itself out of the regular television we see today". Trevor Price of TvTrev, summarised that "PREMature is not only an artistic venture bred in Britain but also a social movement in its own right - smashing stereotypes and providing a just representation for ethnic minorities." Nazhat Khan wrote that the series "exposes the disturbing reality in an average family and school in the UK. By throwing us back and forth between extreme emotions, the bold series strangely leaves you with hopes for the future." Commenting on the tone and presentation, Scarlett Leung found the drama to be "grimly funny at times. Daring in its narrative and emotionally powerful in its delivery."

References

External links
 
PREMature at the Radio Times

2015 British television series debuts
2015 British television series endings
2010s British drama television series
Serial drama television series
Television series about dysfunctional families
Television series about teenagers
2010s British television miniseries
Television shows set in London
Kickstarter-funded television series
Coming-of-age television shows
British teen drama television series
English-language television shows